The Importation Act 1666 (18 & 19 Cha. 2 c. 2) was an Act of the Parliament of England. It banned the importation of Irish cattle into England.

Notes

Acts of the Parliament of England
1666 in law
1666 in England